Forrest Meredith Tucker (February 12, 1919 – October 25, 1986) was an American actor in both movies and television who appeared in nearly a hundred films. Tucker worked as a vaudeville straight man at the age of fifteen. A mentor provided funds and contacts for a trip to California, where party hostess Cobina Wright persuaded guest Wesley Ruggles to give Tucker a screen test because of Tucker's photogenic good looks, thick wavy hair and height of six feet, five inches. Tucker was a sight reader who needed only one take and his film career started well despite a perception in most Hollywood studios that blond men were not photogenic. He enlisted in the Army during World War II. After twenty years spent mainly in Westerns and action roles, he returned to his roots, showing versatility as a comedic and stage musical actor. In the television series F Troop, he became identified with the character of Cavalry Sgt. Morgan O'Rourke (a manipulative character quite similar to Phil Silvers' role as MSgt. Ernie Bilko). Tucker struggled with a drinking problem that began to affect his performances in the later years of his career.

Early life and education
Tucker described himself as a farm boy. He was born in Plainfield, Indiana, on February 12, 1919, a son of Forrest A. Tucker and his wife, Doris Heringlake. His mother has been described as an alcoholic. Tucker began his performing career at age 14 at the 1933 Chicago World's Fair, pushing the big wicker tourist chairs by day and singing "Throw Money" at night. After his family moved to Washington, D.C., Tucker attracted the attention of Jimmy Lake, the owner of the Old Gaiety Burlesque Theater, by winning its Saturday night amateur contest on consecutive weeks. After his second win, Tucker was hired there at full time as Master of Ceremonies, but left when it was soon discovered that he was underage. He graduated from Washington-Lee High School, Arlington, Virginia, near Washington, D.C., in 1938, and, joining the United States Cavalry, was stationed at Fort Myer in Arlington County, Virginia, but discharged for, once again, being underage. He returned to work at the Old Gaiety after his 18th birthday.

Career

Hollywood
When Lake's theatre closed for the summer in 1939, a wealthy mentor helped Tucker travel to California and try to break into film acting. He made a successful screen test, and began auditioning for movie roles. In his own estimation, Tucker was in the mold of large "ugly guys" such as Wallace Beery, Ward Bond and Victor McLaglen, rather than a matinee idol. His debut was as a powerfully built farmer who clashes with the hero in The Westerner (1940), which starred Gary Cooper. Tucker stood out in a fight scene with Cooper. Tucker had a support role in The Great Awakening (1941) for United Artists. Overcoming a feeling in Hollywood that fair hair did not photograph well, he quickly attained leading man status, starring in PRC's Emergency Landing (1941). He signed a contract with Columbia Pictures.

Columbia Pictures
At Columbia Tucker had a support role in one of their Lone Wolf pictures, Counter-Espionage (1942), followed by a Boston Blackie entry, Boston Blackie Goes Hollywood (1942). He was borrowed by Metro-Goldwyn-Mayer for Keeper of the Flame with Tracy and Hepburn.

World War II
Like many other movie actors at the time, Tucker enlisted in the United States Army during World War II; he earned a commission as a second lieutenant.

Post War
Tucker resumed his acting career at war's end. Metro-Goldwyn-Mayer borrowed him for the classic film The Yearling (1946). Warners borrowed him to play Errol Flynn's love rival with Eleanor Parker in Never Say Goodbye the same year.

Back at Columbia Pictures, he was in Coroner Creek (1948) with Randolph Scott.

Republic Pictures
In 1948, Tucker left Columbia and signed with Republic Pictures. His first films for them were Hellfire (1949) and The Last Bandit (1949) with Wild Bill Elliott. He made Montana Belle for Republic with Jane Russell; it was sold to RKO.

Tucker had a role in Republic's Sands of Iwo Jima (1949), as PFC Thomas, a Marine with a score to settle with John Wayne's Sergeant Stryker. He went back to Columbia to support Scott again in The Nevadan (1950).

Tucker was promoted to star roles with California Passage (1950). He followed this with Rock Island Trail (1950).

Tucker was back to supporting actor for Hoodlum Empire (1952) then over at Paramount he co-starred with Sterling Hayden in Flaming Feather (1952) and supported Charlton Heston in Pony Express (1953).

Tucker went to England in support of British film star Margaret Lockwood in Laughing Anne (1953), a co-production with Republic.

Back in the United States, he went back to work for Republic: San Antone (1953) with Rod Cameron; Flight Nurse (1953) and Jubilee Trail (1954) with Joan Leslie.

England and Crunch and Des
He returned to England to make another with Lockwood, Trouble in the Glen (1954), and stayed on to make Break in the Circle (1955) for Hammer Films.

Tucker made some films for Allied Artists, Paris Follies of 1956 (1955) and Finger Man (1955) in support of Frank Lovejoy, and then supported Randolph Scott once more in Rage at Dawn (1956).

Tucker had a two-year stint on television playing the well-received role of a charter-boat captain in Bermuda in the series Crunch and Des from 1955 to 1956 with Sandy Kenyon.

He was top billed in Fox's The Quiet Gun (1957) and supported Charlton Heston in Three Violent People (1957). Hammer Films in Britain asked him back to play the lead in The Abominable Snowman (1957). He stayed on in England for The Strange World of Planet X (1957), and The Trollenberg Terror (1958).

Auntie Mame
The year 1958 brought another turning point in his career, when he won the role of Beauregard Burnside, Mame's first husband in Auntie Mame, the highest grossing U.S. film of the year. Tucker showed a flair for light comedy under the direction of Morton DaCosta that had largely been unexplored in his roles in Westerns and science fiction films.

He supported Joel McCrea in Fort Massacre (1958) and had the lead in Counterplot (1959).

Stage
Tucker was cast as Professor Harold Hill in the national touring production of The Music Man in 1958 and played the role 2,008 times over the next five years, including a 56-week run at the Shubert Theatre in Chicago.

Following his Music Man run, Tucker starred in the Broadway production of Fair Game for Lovers (1964).

Television and F Troop
Tucker turned to television for his most famous role, starring as frontier capitalist Sgt. Morgan O'Rourke in F Troop (1965–67). Though F Troop lasted only two seasons on ABC, the series has been in constant syndication since, reaching three generations of viewers. (Two of his Gunsmoke episodes feature Tucker in his cavalry uniform again, as the unconventional Sergeant Holly (1970), who in one scene "marries" and spends a hectic night with Miss Kitty.)

Later career
After the run of F Troop ended, Tucker returned to films in character roles like The Night They Raided Minsky's (1969), Barquero (1970), Chisum (1970), Welcome Home, Johnny Bristol (1972), and Cancel My Reservation (1972). He had the lead in The Wild McCullochs (1975) and was a supporting actor in the television movie A Real American Hero (1978).

On television, Tucker was a frequent guest star, including a total of six appearances on Gunsmoke and the recurring role of Jarvis Castleberry, Flo's estranged father on the 1976-1985 TV series, Alice and its spinoff, Flo.

Tucker was a regular on three series after F Troop: Dusty's Trail (1973) with Bob Denver; The Ghost Busters (1975) which reunited him with F Troop co-star Larry Storch; guest star on The Bionic Woman as J.T. Conners and Filthy Rich playing the second Big Guy Beck. (1982–83). He continued to be active on stage as well, starring in the national productions of Plaza Suite, Show Boat and That Championship Season.

Tucker returned to the big screen, after an absence of several years, in the Cannon Films action film Thunder Run (1986), playing the hero, trucker Charlie Morrison. His final film appearance was Outtakes, a low-budget imitation of The Groove Tube.

Personal life
Tucker married four times:
 Sandra Jolley (1919–1986) in 1940. She was the daughter of the character actor I. Stanford Jolley (who also died of emphysema) and the sister of the Academy Award-winning art director Stan Jolley. They had a daughter, Pamela "Brooke" Tucker. They divorced in 1950.
 Marilyn Johnson on March 28, 1950 (died of a heart ailment on July 19, 1960 at the age of 37). 
 Marilyn Fisk on October 23, 1961. They had a daughter, Cindy Tucker, and a son, Forrest Sean Tucker. 
 Sheila Forbes on April 15, 1986.

Tucker was a Republican.

Death
Tucker, who had battled lung cancer for more than a year, as well as having a series of minor illnesses, collapsed and was hospitalized, for the second time in a week, on his way to the ceremony for his star on the Hollywood Walk of Fame on August 21, 1986. He died at the Motion Picture & Television Country House and Hospital on October 25, 1986, a few months after the theatrical release of Thunder Run and Outtakes. He was interred in Forest Lawn–Hollywood Hills Cemetery in the Hollywood Hills.

Selected filmography

The Westerner (1940) .... Wade Harper
Emergency Landing (1941) .... Jerry Barton
The Great Awakening (1941) .... Moritz
Honolulu Lu (1941) .... Barney
Shut My Big Mouth (1942) .... Red
Canal Zone (1942) .... Recruit Madigan
Tramp, Tramp, Tramp (1942) .... Blond Bomber
Submarine Raider (1942) .... Pulaski
Parachute Nurse (1942) .... Lt. Tucker
Counter-Espionage (1942) .... Anton Schugg
My Sister Eileen (1942) .... Sandhog (uncredited)
The Spirit of Stanford (1942) .... Buzz Costello (uncredited)
Boston Blackie Goes Hollywood (1942) .... Whipper
Keeper of the Flame (1942) .... Geoffrey Midford
Talk About a Lady (1946) .... Bart Manners
The Man Who Dared (1946) .... Larry James
Renegades (1946) .... Frank Dembrow
Dangerous Business (1946) .... Clayton Russell
Never Say Goodbye (1946) .... Fenwick Lonkowski
The Yearling (1946) .... Lem Forrester
Gunfighters (1947) .... Ben Orcutt
Adventures in Silverado (1948) .... Zeke Butler
Coroner Creek (1948) .... Ernie Combs
Two Guys from Texas (1948) .... 'Tex' Bennett
The Plunderers (1948) .... Whit Lacey
The Last Bandit (1949) .... Jim Plummer
The Big Cat (1949) .... Gil Hawks
Hellfire (1949) .... Marshal Bucky McLean
Brimstone (1949) .... Sheriff Henry McIntyre
Sands of Iwo Jima (1949) .... Pfc. Al Thomas
The Nevadan (1950) .... Tom Tanner
Rock Island Trail (1950) .... Reed Loomis
California Passage (1950) .... Mike Prescott
Oh! Susanna (1951) .... Lieutenant Colonel Unger
Fighting Coast Guard (1951) .... Bill Rourk
Warpath (1951) .... Sgt. O'Hara
Crosswinds (1951) .... Gerald 'Jumbo' Johnson
The Wild Blue Yonder (1951) .... Maj. Tom West
Flaming Feather (1952) .... Lt. Tom Blaine
Bugles in the Afternoon (1952) .... Donavan
Hoodlum Empire (1952) .... Charley Pignatalli
Hurricane Smith (1952) .... Dan McGuire
Montana Belle (1952) .... Mac
Ride the Man Down (1952) .... Sam Danfelser
San Antone (1953) .... Lt. Brian Culver, CSA
Pony Express (1953) .... Wild Bill Hickok
Laughing Anne (1953) .... Jem Farrell
Flight Nurse (1953) .... Capt. Bill Eaton
Jubilee Trail (1954) .... John Ives
Trouble in the Glen (1954) .... Maj. Jim 'Lance' Lansing
Break in the Circle (1955) .... Capt. Skip Morgan
Rage at Dawn (1955) .... Frank Reno
Finger Man (1955) .... Dutch Becker
Night Freight (1955) .... Mike Peters
The Vanishing American (1955) .... Morgan
Paris Follies of 1956 (1955) .... Dan Bradley
Stagecoach to Fury (1956) .... Frank Townsend
Three Violent People (1956) .... Deputy Commissioner Cable
The Quiet Gun (1957) .... Sheriff Carl Brandon
The Abominable Snowman (1957) .... Tom Friend
The Deerslayer (1957) .... Harry March
The Strange World of Planet X (1958) .... Gil Graham
Fort Massacre (1958) .... McGurney
Girl in the Woods (1958) .... Steve Cory
The Trollenberg Terror (1958, also known as The Crawling Eye) .... Alan Brooks
Auntie Mame (1958) .... Beauregard Jackson Pickett Burnside
Gunsmoke in Tucson (1958) .... John Brazos
Counterplot (1959) .... Brock Miller
Don't Worry, We'll Think of a Title (1966) .... Romantic Diner Customer (uncredited)
The Night They Raided Minsky's (1968) .... Trim Houlihan
Barquero (1970) .... Mountain Phil
Chisum (1970) .... Lawrence Murphy
Welcome Home, Johnny Bristol (1972, TV Movie) .... Harry McMartin
Cancel My Reservation (1972) .... Reese
The Wild McCullochs (1975) .... J.J. McCulloch
Walking Tall: Final Chapter (1977) .... Grandpa Pusser
Rare Breed (1984) .... Jess Cutler
Katy Caterpillar (1984) .... Goliath the Cat (English version, voice)
Thunder Run (1986) .... Charlie Morrison
Outtakes (1987) .... Himself
Timestalkers (1987, TV Movie) .... Texas John Cody (final film role)

Television 

Wagon Train episode "The Rex Montana Story" (May 28, 1958) .... Rex Montana
Death Valley Days episode "Three Minutes to Eternity" (1963) .... Bob Dalton of the Dalton Gang. 
The Virginian (episode "Hideout" - 1965) .... Martin Evers
F Troop (1965-1967) .... Sgt. Morgan O'Rourke / Sgt. O'Rourke / Sgt. Morgan Sylvester O'Rourke
Daniel Boone episode "The Ballad of Sidewinder and Cherokee" (1967) .... Joe Snag
Rawhide episode “Incident of the Death Dancer” (Dec 5, 1967)
Gunsmoke episode "Cattle Barons" (1967) .... John Charron
Gunsmoke episode "Sergeant Holly" (1970) .... Sgt. Emmett Holly
Gunsmoke episode "The War Priest" (1970) .... Sergeant Emmett Holly
Alias Smith and Jones episode "Alias Smith and Jones" (1971) .... Deputy Harker Wilkins
Night Gallery (1971) .... Dr. Ernest Stringfellow (segment "Dr. Stringfellow's Rejuvenator")
Columbo episode "Blueprint for Murder" (1972) .... Bo Williamson
Gunsmoke episode "Yankton" (1972) .... Will Donavan
Dusty's Trail (1973-1974) .... Mr. Callahan
The Ghost Busters (1975) .... Jake Kong
Little House on the Prairie episode "Founder's Day" (1975)
Kojak episode "On The Edge" (1975) .... Det. Paul Zachary
The Bionic Woman episode "The Deadly Missiles" (1976) .... J.T. Connors
Once an Eagle miniseries (1976) .... Col. Avery
The Rebels (1979, TV Movie) .... Angus Fletcher
Alice (1979) .... Edsel Jarvis Castleberry
Flo (1980) .... Jarvis Castleberry
 The Love Boat (1980, 1982, 1983) .... 3 episodes (3 roles)
Murder, She Wrote episode "It's a Dog's Life" (1984) .... Tom Cassidy

References

External links

 
 
 Biography and list of appearances
 Grave at seeing-stars.com

1919 births
1986 deaths
Military personnel from Indiana
United States Army Cavalry Branch personnel
American male film actors
American male television actors
American male musical theatre actors
Burials at Forest Lawn Memorial Park (Hollywood Hills)
Male actors from Indiana
Deaths from lung cancer in California
People from Plainfield, Indiana
United States Army officers
United States Army personnel of World War II
20th-century American male actors
20th-century American singers
California Republicans
20th-century American male singers
Washington-Liberty High School alumni